Fravashi is a 2014 Australian independent short film, directed by Salvatore Finocchiaro and produced and filmed entirely in Darwin, Northern Territory.

Cast
 Giacomo Pandini as Jack
 Sarina Bevan as Angel
 Matthew Phillips as Jack's Father
 Auki Henry as The Dark Angel
 Larry Owens as The Gatekeeper
 Vernon Lowe as the Bike Rider
 Ashlee McInnes as the Thief
 Maya De Luca as the Thief's Child

References

External links
 

2014 films
Australian drama short films
2010s English-language films
2010s Australian films